Kenneth Ross Mann (born September 5, 1953) is a Canadian retired professional ice hockey right winger who played in one National Hockey League game for the Detroit Red Wings during the 1975–76 season. Mann previously served as a coach in the national senior amateur men's ice hockey league.

Career statistics

Regular season and playoffs

See also
 List of players who played only one game in the NHL

References

External links
 

1953 births
Living people
Canadian ice hockey right wingers
Detroit Red Wings players
Flint Generals players
Hamilton Red Wings (OHA) players
Ice hockey people from Ontario
Kalamazoo Wings (1974–2000) players
Kansas City Blues players
Port Huron Flags (IHL) players
Sportspeople from Hamilton, Ontario
Undrafted National Hockey League players
Virginia Wings players
Windsor Spitfires players